Top Model Türkiye was a Turkish reality competition produced by D Productions, broadcast by Star TV and part of the Top Model series created by Tyra Banks. The show was cancelled after the first season due to low ratings. It was won by Selda Car. Şeyma Subaşı and Senem Kuyucuoğlu, two other finalists have gone on to become prominent models with Kuyucuoğlu finishing second at the 2009 Miss Turkey national pageant and representing her nation at the 2009 Miss Universe pageant.

The competition 
Auditions were held across several Turkish provinces. Out of 20 shortlisted, 12 were selected by the jury to enter the final and moved to a luxury villa in  Zekeriyaköy.

Judges
Deniz Akkaya (Host)
Uġurkan Erez
Cengiz Abazoġlu

Cycles

Top Model Türkiye

Contestants

(ages stated at start of contest)

Call-out order

 The contestant was eliminated
 The contestant won the competition

References

Turkey’s Next Top Model

External links
Turkey's Next Top Model Official Site
Contestants

Top Model
2006 Turkish television series debuts
2006 Turkish television series endings
Star TV (Turkey) original programming
Turkish television series based on American television series
Television shows filmed in Turkey
Television shows filmed in Italy